Mormogystia is a genus of moths belonging to the family Cossidae.

Diagnosis
Mormogystia is distinguished from all other Cossidae genera by having large
silvery areas on the forewing.

Description
Medium-sized, brightly coloured moths. Male antennae bipectinate with very short processes; female antennal pecten much reduced. Large silvery areas on the forewing forming fasciae make this the only Cossidae genus to have such a high contrast pattern. Hindwings are uniform.

Distribution
The genus consists of four species distributed in north Africa, the Levant, Arabian Peninsula and Kenya.

Species

Mormogystia brandstetteri Saldaitis, Ivinskis & Yakovlev, 2011
Mormogystia equatorialis (Le Cerf, 1933)
Mormogystia proleuca (Hampson in Walsingham et Hampson, 1896)
Mormogystia reibellii (Oberthür, 1876)

References
Cossidae of the Socotra Archipelago (Yemen)

Cossinae